Brundlefly or Brundle Fly or variation, can mean:

Brundlefly (character), the name Seth Brundle (Jeff Goldblum) gives himself in David Cronenberg's 1986 film The Fly

Music
Brundlefly (band), a Canadian alternative rock band
"Brundlefly" (song), 1986 instrumental from the soundtrack album for The Fly (1986 film)
"Brundle Fly" (song), a 2000 song by Usurp Synapse
"Brundlefly" (song), a 2004 song by Byzantine off the album The Fundamental Component
"Brundle Fly" (song), a 2009 song by Josh Dies off the EP Talons

Other uses
 Brundle Fly (malware), a Linux ELF-infector virus; see Linux malware

See also

 
 Brundle (disambiguation)
 Fly (disambiguation)